The Wilsons may refer to:

 The Wilsons (album), 1997 album by Carnie and Wendy Wilson
 The Wilsons (country duo), musicians and television hosts